Sam Mangwana (born 21 February 1945), is a Congolese-born musician, born to an Angolan mother and Zimbabwean father. He was the frontman of his bands Festival des Maquisards and African All Stars. Mangwana was a member of François Luambo Makiadi's seminal band TPOK Jazz, and Tabu Ley Rochereau's bands African Fiesta, African Fiesta National and Afrisa International.

History
He was born on 21 February 1945 in then Leopoldville, now Kinshasa, the capital of the Democratic Republic of the Congo, and the largest city in that country. Mangwana's parents were native of neighboring Angola. His father was a Zimbabwean, who was born in Chivi. Over the years Sam Mangwana has visited his relatives in Zimbabwe.  

Mangwana made his professional debut in 1963 with the Congo-Kinshasa rumba band, African Fiesta, owned and led by Tabu Ley Rochereau. Mangwana moved across the Congo River to Brazzaville where he formed a short-lived group called Los Batchichas. He also worked with the more established Negro Band and Orchestre Tembo. He then crossed back to Kinshasa where he joined Tabu Ley, whose band was now known as African Fiesta National.

In 1967, Mangwana again left to form Festival des Maquisards. The band included notable recording artists; vocalists Dalienst and Madilu System, guitarist Dizzy Mandjeku and lead guitarist Michelino. Two years later, Sam Mangwana was on the move again. He recorded duos with a guitarist called Jean Paul "Guvano" Vangu, until 1972.

In 1972 he joined TPOK Jazz, led by Franco. Mangwana often played lead singer on compositions by OK Jazz guitarist Simaro Lutumba. His popularity increased during this time. The collaboration with Simaro yielded three hits: "Ebale ya Zaire", "Cedou" and "Mabele". He left OK Jazz and briefly to re-joined Tabu Ley's band, now called Afrisa. He then left again, this time moving to Abidjan, Côte d'Ivoire, in West Africa. In 1978 he formed, along with others, the band African All Stars.

When the All Stars broke up in 1979, he became a solo artist. He recorded and toured with varying combinations of musicians. Maria Tebbo (1980) with remnants of the All Stars, Coopération (1982) with Franco, Canta Moçambique (1983) with Mandjeku, and albums with saxophonist Empompo Loway under the names Tiers Monde Coopération and Tiers Monde Révolution were highlights of his career in the 1980s.

Due to his frequent goings and comings, he won the nickname "pigeon voyageur" (travelling pigeon). In the 2000s, Mangwana spent most of his time in Angola, emerging periodically to perform concerts in Europe.

Band memberships
 African Fiesta, 1962
 Festival des Maquisards, 1968
 TPOK Jazz, 1972
 African Fiesta National
 Afrisa International
 African All Stars, 1978

Discography
 African All Stars: Les Champions, 1977
 Sam Mangwana et l'African All Stars: Georgette Eckins, 1978
 Théo-Blaise Kounkou et l'African All Stars: Zenaba (1978)
 Sam Mangwana et l'African All Stars: International Sam Mangwana (1979)
 Waka Waka, 1978
 Maria Tebbo, 1979
 Georgette Eckins, 1979
 Matinda, 1979
 Affaire Disco, 1981
 Est-ce Que Tu Moyens?, 1981
 Cooperation, 1982
 Affaire Video, 1982
 N'Simba Eli, 1982
 Bonne Annee, 1983
 In Nairobi, 1984
 Aladji, 1987
 For Ever, 1989
 Lukolo, 1989
 Capita General, 1990
 Megamix, July 1990
 Rumba Music, 1993
 No Me Digas No, 1995
 Galo Negro, 1998
 Sam Mangwana Sings Dino Vangu, 2000
 Volume 1 Bilinga Linga 1968/1969, June 2000
 Volume 2 Eyebana 1980/1984, June 2000
 Very Best of 2001, March 2001
 Cantos de Esperanca, April 2003
 Lubamba, 2016

 With TPOK Jazz
 Lufua Lua Nkadi - Sung by Sam Mangwana, Michel Boyibanda, Josky Kiambukuta and Lola Checain in 1972.
 Luka Mobali Moko -Sung by Sam Mangwana, Josky Kiambukuta, Michèl Boyibanda and Lola Chécain, in 1974.

Contributing artist
 The Rough Guide to Congo Gold (2008, World Music Network)

See also
 Ndombe Opetum
 Josky Kiambukuta
 Lola Checain
 Michel Boyibanda
 Wuta Mayi
 Bopol Mansiamina

References

External links
Flemming Harrev, Sam Mangwana and Congolese Music (biography and discography), 2005 version
Flemming Harrev, Sam Mangwana profile, most recent version
[There is significant overlap between these, and also with Flemming Harrev's liner notes for Sam Mangwana's 1989 Canta Mocambique album.]

1946 births
Living people
People from Kinshasa
Democratic Republic of the Congo people of Angolan descent
Democratic Republic of the Congo people of Zimbabwean descent
Soukous musicians
20th-century Democratic Republic of the Congo male singers
TPOK Jazz members